Maison de L'Amitié (House of Friendship) was a French Regency-style estate in Palm Beach, Florida, United States. It was one of the largest and most expensive homes in the United States. Maison de L'Amitié had three outbuildings: a barn and two houses for guests plus a pool and hot tub. Besides the pool there was an outbuilding with two bedrooms and bathroom. A coach house was located next to the entrance gate, and the third outbuilding was located on the edge of a courtyard. The estate also included a  tennis house.

The home was demolished in 2016.

Interior
The rooms had 18- to 36-feet high ceilings and were finished with marble and granite. Gold and diamonds were used in the bathrooms. The kitchen had mahogany furniture and stainless steel appliances. Maison de L'Amitié also had a garage which fits nearly 50 cars.<ref name="zwembad">{{Cite web |url =http://money.ca.msn.com/banking/homebuyersguide/gallery/dollar100-million-homes?page=11 |title =$100 million homes |last =Brennan |first =Morgan |date =January 16, 2013 |access-date =November 2, 2016 |archive-url =https://web.archive.org/web/20140424162329/http://money.ca.msn.com/banking/homebuyersguide/gallery/dollar100-million-homes?page=11 |archive-date =April 24, 2014 |url-status =dead }}</ref>

During a tour of the property in 2007, reporter Jose Lambiet noted shortcuts and flaws, including suspiciously thin, bulletproof hurricane windows and gold fixtures in the bathrooms that were only painted gold. Lambiet said that the property had persistent mold and was difficult to air condition.

History
The property of Maison de L'Amitié was formerly owned by Dun & Bradstreet family member Robert Dun Douglass. It was sold to tycoon Harrison Williams in 1930. Owner Jayne Wrightsman sold the house on May 1, 1985, for $10 million to Les Wexner. Three years later, on May 27, 1988, it was sold to Massachusetts nursing home magnate Abraham "Abe" D. Gosman for $12,089,500. Gosman built the mansion on the property and named it Maison de L'Amitié''. On July 30, 1999, the house was put in the name of his wife, Linda C. Gosman. After Abe Gosman filed for Chapter 7 bankruptcy liquidation in 2003, the property went up for auction in 2004.

On January 7, 2005, entrepreneur Donald Trump bought the home for $41.35 million outbidding Jeffrey Epstein. Trump listed the home in early 2006 for $125 million. An employee of Trump Properties in Florida said that Trump had spent $25 million on renovations, while Trump himself claimed to have only spent around $3 million renovating the house. In March 2008, after cycling through several real estate brokers, Trump lowered the asking price to $100 million. On July 16, 2008, Trump sold the home to Russian billionaire Dmitry Rybolovlev through his County Road Property LLC, for $95 million. At the time it was the most expensive residential property sale to ever occur in the United States. The Rybolovlevs had tried to secure a $25 million discount for the property.

Rybolovlev purchased the home with a trust. During divorce proceedings for the Rybolovlevs, Dmitry denied direct or indirect ownership of the house in a 2011 deposition. The house remained empty since the purchase.

In 2013, a Palm Beach County appraisal of the house valued it at $59.8 million. Rybolovlev said in 2013 that he wanted to demolish the house. He described it as an opportunity to divide the land into smaller plots. A plan to demolish the residence was approved by the Palm Beach architectural commission in April 2016. The Palm Beach Town Council approved a proposal to subdivide the property into three parcels of around two acres each. One parcel of  sold for $34.34 million.

References

1988 establishments in Florida
Houses in Palm Beach County, Florida
Residential buildings completed in 1988
Villas in the United States
Demolished buildings and structures in Florida
Buildings and structures demolished in 2016